La niña de la mochila azul (in English: The girl with the blue backpack) is a 1979  Mexican motion picture, based on the song La de la Mochila Azul from the album by the same name, performed by Pedrito Fernández. This film is categorized as a Musical, Drama and Comedy. 

This was the first film starred in by Pedro Fernández credited as Pedrito Fernández  when he was a child. At age seven, prior to the making of the movie, Pedro recorded La de la Mochila Azul and the success of that song was so great that he came to star in the subsequent iconic film. That song became the title track of this movie and a long distinguished career as an actor and singer continued. 

The movie became an immediate success and resulted in a continuation with the La niña de la mochila azul 2. Both films also starred the popular comedian Adalberto Martínez as 'Resortes', and María Rebeca as Amy, the girl with the blue backpack. The popular song is still requested by fans at Pedro Fernández concerts today and the movie is still popular as a classic. Filmed near the infamous cascadas in Muzquiz, Coahuila - El Oasis Del Norte.

Synopsis  

A charming family film about first love. Amy (María Rebeca) and her friend Raul (Pedrito Fernández) live in a fishing village in Texas. Raul falls in love with Amy, an orphaned child living with her uncle Andrew (Adalberto Martínez "Resortes") who, despite being a drunkard, has been a father figure to her. However, the poor conditions in which Amy lives lead local authorities to try to separate them. A serious accident at sea will change the life of Amy, Andrew, and Raul, whose goodness will be the key to Amy’s happiness.

Cast 

Adalberto Martínez "Resortes" as Uncle Andrew 
Pedrito Fernández as Raúl 
María Rebeca as Amy 
Mónica Prado as Elena, Mother of Raúl  
Mario Cid as Fernando, Father of Raúl 
Federico Falcón as El Oso   
José Luis Estrada 
Janet Mass 
Irma Lozano
Marco Antonio Campos as Viruta
Severiano Juárez (Second Character)

References

External links 
 

1979 films
Mexican musical comedy-drama films
1970s Spanish-language films